Five-pin bowling is a bowling variant which is played in Canada, where many bowling alleys offer it, either alone or in combination with ten-pin bowling. It was devised around 1909 by Thomas F. Ryan in Toronto, Ontario, at his Toronto Bowling Club, in response to customers who complained that the ten-pin game was too strenuous. He cut five tenpins down to about 75% of their size, and used hand-sized hard rubber balls, thus inventing the original version of five-pin bowling.

Gameplay 

The balls in five pin bowling are small enough to fit in the hand and therefore typically have no fingerholes, although the Canadian 5 Pin Bowlers Association (C5PBA) have approved balls with thumb holes made by one manufacturer (the E. Parrella Co., known as EPCO). 

At the end of the lane there are five pins arranged in a V. They are midway in size between duckpins and ten pins, and they have a heavy rubber band around their middles to make them move farther when struck. 

Unlike any other form of bowling popular in North America, the pins in five-pin bowling are worth different scoring point values, depending on their location in the V-formation. The centre pin is worth five points if knocked down, those on either side, three each, and the outermost pins, two each, giving a total of 15 in each frame.

In each frame, each player gets three attempts to knock all five pins over. Knocking all five pins down with the first ball is a strike, worth 15 points, plus the score achieved by the player's first two balls of the next frame are added to the score for the strike; the count in the frame where the first strike was bowled is left blank until the bowler makes their first delivery of the next frame. As those points are also counted in their own frame, in effect they count double. A player who takes two balls to knock all the pins down gets a spare, which means the first ball of the next frame counts double. When a bowler bowls two strikes in succession, within a game, the bowler has scored a "double". When a double has been bowled, the count for the first strike is 30 points plus the value of the pins bowled down with the first ball of the frame following the second strike. When a bowler bowls three strikes in succession, within a game, the bowler has scored a "triple" (also called a "turkey"). In scoring three successive strikes, the bowler is credited with 45 points in the frame where the first strike was bowled. As in ten-pin, if either of these happen in the last frame, the player gets to take one or two shots at a re-racked set of pins immediately.

A perfect score is 450, requiring 12 consecutive strikes bowled in the same game without fouling. It does not happen as frequently as in tenpin bowling. The C5PBA sanctions from 15 to 30 perfect games annually.

Originally the pins counted as (from left to right) 4 - 2 - 1 - 3 - 5 points. In 1952 the president of the Canadian Bowling Association proposed changing the scoring system to 2 - 3 - 5 - 3 - 2. That was accepted in the west in 1952, in Ontario in 1953, and in the rest of Canada in 1954.

In 1967 the Canadian Bowling Congress decided to abolish the counter pin (the left counter pin had to be knocked down to score any points). The counter pin was the right 2-pin for left-handed bowlers. The rule change went in effect in 1968 in eastern Canada, but the Western Canada 5-pin Bowling Association rejected the change, and as a result there were no national championships until 1972 after the west accepted abolishing the counter pin. (Although some leagues continued with the counter pin system for several more years.)

Five-pin bowling allows for more strategy in its play than the ten-pin variant, because of the differing point values for each pin. For example: If a player fails to score a strike in 10-pin bowling, it is less important how the player chooses to resolve the remaining pins, as all pins are valued the same, and knocking down more results in higher points. In five-pin bowling on the other hand, if a player misses a strike, he or she has to make a strategic decision as to which set of remaining pins they should attempt to knock down (beyond simply trying for them all), which allows players a means to minimize their losses after a mistake, by aiming for the higher-scoring group of pins, or for the lower but perhaps more easily struck group.

Terminology 

Five-pin bowlers use a number of terms to denote the results of a throw:

 "[number]-pack": Term for a number of consecutive strikes; e.g. six consecutive strikes is a "six-pack". Also referred to as "[number]-bagger" (e.g. six-bagger).
 "10 the hard way": After the third ball, having a frame score of 10 where the remaining pins are a 3-pin and a 2-pin that are not "neighbours".
 "Aces" (A): taking out the headpin and both three pins but leaving the two corner pins. Also referred to as "bed posts", "goal posts" or "channel 11".
 "Chop" or "chop-off" (denoted ℅): Hitting the headpin and the 3 and 2 pins on one side on the first ball, leaving the other 3 and 2 pins on the other side.
 "Clean game": Finishing a game with a strike or spare in every frame.
 "Corner-pin": Leaving only the left corner pin or right corner pin standing on the first ball is denoted by an "L" or an "R" respectively on a score sheet.
 "Fifteen": When all pins are knocked down after the third ball. Also referred to as a "clean up".
 "Headpin" (denoted H on a score sheet): punching out the headpin on the first ball. This is the most dreaded result on the first ball, as converting the spare resulting from punching out the headpin (a "headpin-spare") is extremely difficult to achieve.
 "Punch": Hitting only one pin when two or more pins are remaining (commonly known as a "cherry" on the 2nd or 3rd ball)
 "Split" (S): Taking out the headpin and one of the three-pins, scoring 8 on the first ball. Difficult to obtain a spare on the second ball but if accomplished, this is known as a "split-spare". Many bowling associations will offer a special pin for this achievement.
 "Strike out": Finishing the game with Three or more strikes.
 "Turkey": Three consecutive strikes
 "Canada Goose or Goose": Four consecutive strikes
 "Wood" or "deadwood": The pins left on the lane, usually after throwing the first two balls of a frame. This originates from when bowling pins were typically made of wood and not acrylic.

Mechanics of the game (pin-setting) 

All modern bowling centres use automated pin-setting machines (first used in 1957) to reset the pins after each ball is thrown. In five-pin, two types of pinsetters are used—"string" and "free fall".

"String" pinsetters were first invented in 1963 and are characterized by a string being attached to the head of each pin. This type of pinsetter has a low operating cost, so it is the most commonly used type of pinsetter. There are three families of string pinsetters:

 The PBS family of pinsetters are the most frequently used, and many consider the PBS as the workhorse of the industry. The PBS family includes models made by Schmid & Company (sometimes branded as BowlOMatic) as well as the CA-1.  These machines are straight electrical and do not require air compressors unlike pneumatic machines.  The Schmid machines ran using relays while the CA-1 used circuit boards.  The PBS brand was bought out by Brunswick, who introduced a second generation Schmid pinsetter dubbed the 81-5 as well as a 10-pin string pinsetter and a convertible five-ten pin machine marketed as the Chamelion.
  The Mendes family of string pinsetters is not as common as the PBS family.  Mendes machines are easily spotted for its shield that descends on a hinge like a closing door. The machine may immediately start up if all the pins are knocked down.  The early Mendes string pinsetters were pneumatic. They released an electrical version of the machine known as the ME90.  Mendes was bought out by Qubica—now QubicaAMF Worldwide. The machine is now marketed by QubicaAMF under the TMS name  These machines are available for five and ten pin, but there is no convertible version.
 A third family of pinsetter was recently released into the market by Paule Computer Systems. The machine—marketed as the Merlin—is a convertible five/ten pin string pinsetter that uses 15 strings. The changeover time of this machine is quick. The PBS version uses 12 strings—a changeover requires the headpin and the two corners to be restrung.  The original Merlin involved a pin table that allowed the corner pin cells and head pin cell to be moved to change the mode.  A newer version of the 15-string machine involves a wider pin table that can be shifted to left for 10 pin mode or right for 5 pin mode.

The most common stop on string pinsetters is a string tangle.

The "free fall" pinsetter works like ten-pin. A reset is completed by sweeping the old pins off the pindeck and setting a fresh set of pins in its place. The swept pins are elevated back to the top to create the next setup. Free fall pinsetters for 5-pin are no longer made due to high operation and maintenance costs.

There were three common types of free fall pinsetters:

 The Double Diamond was the first pinsetter invented for five-pin. This pneumatic machine was characterized by a sweep that did not stay descended while the pin table was moving.  The pin table is similar to a candlepin tube board with a protective front plate that was often used for advertising. This machine was known for many peculiar sounds; including a hiss on the descent of the pin table and a "clang" when the pin table is hit by a pin. The elevator and pit floor is similar to the Brunswick GSX. The pins and balls are elevated to an upper carousel, where the balls are separated from the pins. When five pins are aligned in the carousel, they are lowered into five chutes leading to each pin position. The machine is loaded with 21 to 22 pins.
 Brunswick offered free-fall machines for five-pin before buying out PBS. To the average bowler, the machine has a look and behavior similar to tenpin's A-2 pinsetter.  The pit floor had a conveyor belt. There were two models, each having a different type of elevator. The A-50 used two different belts to grip pins and balls. The A-51 used an oval shaped elevator.  The oval elevator contained "cups" and each can move one ball or hold one pin by the belly.  Most lanes equipped with these machines have been upgraded to string pinsetters.
 A less commonly found machine was the Strickland pinsetter—a pneumatic machine characterized by separate pinsetting and pin pickup tables. Its behavior is similar to the A-2.  On a reset, it can be difficult to see the actual pinsetting table. The pins rest on forks on the pin table. When the pins reach the deck, the pinsetting table shifts back several inches before rising back to its back up lifted raised position.  When the pins are cycled back to the top, they actually hang from supporting forks positioned such that the next rack of pins is in position. The pinsetting table then rises to pick up the hanging pins. The elevator for this machine is oval in shape; it is not as eccentric as the A51. When balls reach the top of the elevator, gravity takes the ball to the ball track.  The last Strickland installation was upgraded to CA-1 machines in the summer of 2018.

Bowlers must initiate all free-fall pinsetter cycles. The five-pin free-fall pinsetter does not automatically react to a ball rolled or pin knocked down. When bowling on free fall pinsetters, the bowler would have to press a button to initiate a pick-up cycle to clear downed pins lying on the pin deck. If automatic scoring is in use, all automatic resets are actually initiated by the scoring computers.

The lower operating and maintenance costs of the string pinsetter eventually led to the demise of free-fall pinsetters. When a bowling centre retires free-fall pinsetters, the old machines are usually bought by other free-fall equipped bowling centres and are disassembled for parts.

As of the fall 2022, free fall is still located in the following locations.  These centers use Double Diamond machines.
16 lanes in an east end Toronto bowling centre
8 lanes in a bowling center in Espanola, Ontario
Two of 8 lanes at a bowling center in Carman, Manitoba.

The last national tournaments that were conducted using free fall pinsetters were parts of the 2014 YBC and Masters Nationals – held in Winnipeg.  The Double Diamond machines were upgraded to strings shortly after these tournaments.

Major tournaments 

There are four groups overseeing the major tournaments in five pin bowling.
Canadian Five Pin Bowler's Association (C5PBA):  The C5PBA is the body that governs the rules and regulations of the game. The C5PBA operates three major national tournaments.  The showcase tournament is the "Open", a scratch tournament that involves both teams and singles. The national finals of the Open span three to four days and culminate with a stepladder format to determine national champions in men's singles, women's singles, men's teams, women's teams, and mixed teams.  There is a second tournament known as The Youth Challenge, which is shorter than the Open in length, but involves a similar format to the Open, this tournament is for youth bowlers between the ages of 12 and 19. The Inter-Provincial, which replaced the High Low Doubles, became a national event in 2008 and is a pins over average (POA) team format.
Bowl Canada:  Bowl Canada is the body that represents the bowling centre owners. The organization previously operated under Bowling Proprietors Association of Canada (BPAC).  Bowl Canada oversees Youth Bowling Canada (YBC) and Club 55+ (formerly the Golden Age Bowler's Club).  Both organizations feature national championships. The YBC national championship is known as the "Four Steps to Stardom" while the Club 55+ national championship is known as the "Team Triples".  Bowl Canada also runs the National Classified Championships, a scratch tournament where bowlers are qualify through their bowling centre within average categories.  In 2016, the National Classified was replaced with a handicap-format tournament known as the Bowl Canada Cup while the Team Triples was updated to a four-person handicap-format team known as the "Club 55+ Cup". Bowl Canada runs the Canadian qualifying for the AMF World Cup and the various five-pin TV shows such as CBC's Championship Five Pin Bowling and the TSN Pins Game.  In 2006, the CBC series and the TSN series were consolidated into one tournament, the Canadian Bowling Championships. As of 2009, TSN dropped the Canadian Bowling Championships from its televised schedule.
The Master Bowlers Association of Canada: The MBAC is a unique organization that serves as the technical branch of the sport and provides a single national championship with both total pinfall (Tournament division) and pins over average (Teaching Division) divisions. A third branch of this organization involves the Seniors Division (over 55yrs). Typically the Teaching and Senior Division bowlers hold mid- to lower-range bowling averages. Bowlers in the Teaching Division are required to serve as coaches in YBC. The Master Bowlers operate under a strict dress code including a standard shirt in the provincial colours with the bowler's name embroidered on the back.
The Western Canadian Bowling Tour has grown in size and now has four major cash tournaments. The 'Autumn Open is held in Calgary, Alberta at Paradise Lanes. The TPC at Sherwood is at Sherwood Bowl in Sherwood Park, Alberta. Joining the WCBT in 2022 was the Manitoba Open, which is played at St. James Lanes in Winnipeg.  The Regina Classic is played at the Golden Mile Bowling Center in Regina, Saskatchewan. The Heritage Traditional is played in Red Deer, Alberta at Heritage Lanes. The season is now capped off by the WCBTour Championship in August, where the Top 12 players with membership for the season go and compete in a filmed tournament to determine the Tour Champion.

Qualifying for a national championship usually requires three qualifying rounds.

 League, House or Centre round: for most provinces, this is usually not required for the C5PBA Open or C5PBA Youth Challenge.
 Zone round: the number of centres in each zone varies, but the zones are set up geographically. In some provinces and tournaments, the zone round may be bypassed.
 Provincial championships: the winners of the zone round qualify for the provincial finals.  For most tournaments, Ontario runs two provincial finals—a north provincial (Northern Ontario) and a south provincial (Ontario).

Each province also offers a number of tournaments that conclude with the provincial finals.  The tournaments, formats and prize offerings vary by province.  These tournaments are operated through the Provincial Bowling Proprietors Association, local and provincial five pin associations, and individual bowling centres.

Facts and figures 

 At first, bowling pins used in five-pin were made of plastic-coated maple. Today's pins are made of a hard plastic and often feature UV-glow capability for black light glow bowling operations.  The pin makes a "clack" sound when hit by the ball. The base of the plastic pin can be separated from the rest of the pin. The neck stripes on plastic pins are actually a red plastic tape that wears off with use and can be replaced. In 2011, the C5PBA approved a new pin base. The new base adds 1/8 inch of height to the pin, raises the pin's center of gravity, and lowers the contact area with the lane. This new base has a dark color, so pins with the new base may appear to the bowler as floating above the lane.
 In 1990, the Canadian 5 Pin Bowlers Association sanctioned the use of personalized bowling balls. Before then, only bowling balls supplied by the bowling centre were allowed to be used.
 Many five pin tournaments scored by handicap usually use a scoring basis of "pins over average", which is the difference between the outcome of a game and the bowler's established average. It accumulates over the number of games bowled. This statistic can be negative.
 Several popular automatic scoring systems have five pin versions. On most string type pinsetters, automatic scoring equipment is connected directly to the pinsetter circuitry. Scoring cameras can be used on both types of pinsetting installations. Most systems mount the camera mounted between lanes as in tenpin; however the ProScore system—when installed on free-fall—reads scores using a set of five electronic eyes mounted above the pindeck.
 Bowling centres with convertible pinsetters usually will set specific hours as to when their convertible lanes will support five-pin or ten-pin. Convertible machines may support duckpin bowling instead of ten-pin when in ten-pin mode. String pinsetters are not sanctioned by the USBC for ten-pin play, partially because a "stringsetter" cannot handle an "off-spot" pin situation.
 Some five-pin centres have installed lane protection devices. The device is a sheet of plexiglas mounted vertically about six inches (15 cm) above the lane and is located just past the target arrows on the lane. This device discourages bowlers from lofting the ball and damaging the lane—which is more prevalent in small ball bowling. A ball that knocks the plexiglas loose or flies over the plexiglas guard is worth zero points under C5PBA rules.
 A foul line violation in five-pin results in a 15-point penalty. Pins knocked over during a violating delivery count. The penalty is assessed at the end of the game. This compares to a zero score for the ball in other bowling disciplines.
 Some believe that the hockey term "five-hole" (the space between the goaltender's legs) is taken from five-pin bowling. Knocking out the headpin (worth 5 points) by itself leaves a large hole through which it is easy to put the next one or two balls without hitting anything.
 Five-pin bowling is played in all Canadian provinces and territories. However, in Quebec, New Brunswick and Nova Scotia, unlike in the rest of the country, five-pin is not the dominant form of bowling. In Quebec, five-pin is known as "cinq quilles" (five pins) in French, while "Petite Quilles" refers to the duckpin game. There is only one five-pin bowling alley in all of New Brunswick, whereas in Nova Scotia, the Worcester, Massachusetts–originated sport of candlepin bowling is more popular given that five-pin bowling alleys are located primarily on army bases.  Nunavut has only one five-pin bowling alley.  It is a two-lane facility located at CFS Alert and also happens to be the world's most northerly bowling lanes. As a result, this alley is only accessible to military personnel and visitors to the base.
 Five-pin bowling was one of four sports featured on the Canadian Inventions: Sports series issued by Canada Post stamps on August 10, 2009.
 In 2007, five-pin bowling was ranked #4 during the CBC miniseries The Greatest Canadian Invention.

References

Further reading 
 
 Five-Pin Bowling Timeline

External links 
 Canadian 5 Pin Bowlers Association
 Candlepin Duckpin 5 pin and 9 pin centers of North America

 
Bowling
Sports originating in Canada
History of Toronto